Anatoly Dmitriyevich Artamonov (born 1952, in , Kaluga Oblast, USSR) is Russian politician, former governor of Kaluga Oblast.  In November 1996, Artamonov was elected vice-governor of Kaluga Oblast. On 12 November 2000 he was elected governor of Kaluga Oblast with 56.72% of the vote; and re-elected on 14 March 2004 with 66.86% of the vote.  On 21 July 2005, President Vladimir Putin nominated Artamonov to retain his position; the nomination was confirmed by the Kaluga duma on 26 July.  In 2002, Artamonov was named governor of the year by the Russian Biographical Institute.

Artamonov has been praised for managing to promote Kaluga Oblast as a destination for foreign investors, leading to the establishment of an automotive cluster in the region, and for creating a pro-business environment. Because of this, he managed to reorient the local economy away from Soviet-era military industries and promoted infrastructure spending on projects like the reconstruction of Kaluga Airport.

He is reportedly an admirer of former Singaporean president Lee Kuan Yew. In 2013 Artamonov was found guilty of defamation by a Krasnoyarsk Krai court for calling Russian oligarch Oleg Deripaska "a crook".

References

External links 
  Official website

1952 births
21st-century Russian politicians
Chevaliers of the Légion d'honneur
Commanders Crosses of the Order of Merit of the Federal Republic of Germany
Communist Party of the Soviet Union members
Governors of Kaluga Oblast
Living people
Members of the Federation Council of Russia (after 2000)
People from Kaluga Oblast
Recipients of the Order "For Merit to the Fatherland", 3rd class
Recipients of the Order "For Merit to the Fatherland", 4th class
Recipients of the Order of Honour (Russia)
Recipients of the Order of the Lion of Finland
United Russia politicians
Sanctioned due to Russo-Ukrainian War